The Roman Catholic Archdiocese of São Luís do Maranhão is a Latin archdiocese in Brazil.

Its cathedral is a World Heritage Site (Minor): Catedral Metropolitana Nossa Senhora da Vitória Catedral Metropolitana Nossa Senhora da Vitória.  It is located in the city of São Luís do Maranhão.

History 
 Established on 30 August 1677 as Diocese of São Luís do Maranhão, on territory split off from the Diocese of Olinda
 Lost territory pn 4 March 1720 to establish Diocese of Belém do Pará
 Lost territory on 10 February 1902 to establish Diocese of Piaui
 2 December 1921: Promoted as Archdiocese of São Luís do Maranhão
 10 February 1922: Promoted as Metropolitan Archdiocese of São Luís do Maranhão, having lost territory to establish the then Territorial Prelature of São José do Grajaú (now suffragan diocese of Grajau)
 Lost territory on 1939.07.22 to establish suffragan Diocese of Caxias do Maranhão and Territorial Prelature of Pinheiro (now a suffragan diocese)
 Lost territory on 1962.10.30 to establish suffragan Diocese of Viana
 Lost territory on 1968.06.22 to establish suffragan Diocese of Bacabal
 Lost territory on 1971.09.14 to establish suffragan Diocese of Brejo
 Lost territory on 1977.08.26 to establish suffragan Diocese of Coroatá
 It enjoyed a papal visit from Pope John Paul II in October 1991.

Bishops
(all Roman Rite)

Episcopal ordinaries
Suffragan Bishops of São Luís do Maranhão  
 Fr. Antônio de Santa Maria (1677 – death 1677 not possessed)
 Gregório dos Anjos, ? (C.S.J.) (1677.08.30 – death 1689.05.11), previously Bishop of Malacca (Malaysia) (? – 1677.08.30 not possessed)
 Francisco de Lima, Carmelites O. Carm. (1691.12.19 – 1695.08.22), later Bishop of Olinda (Brazil) (1695.08.22 – death 1704.04.29)
 Timóteo do Sacramento, Benedictine Order (O.S.P.) (1696.12.17 – retired 1700), previously Bishop of Tomé (São Tomé and Príncipe) (1693.01.02 – 1696.12.17)
 José Delgarte, Trinitarians (O.SS.T.) (1716.10.05 – death 1724.12.23)
 Manoel da Cruz Nogueira, Cistercians (O. Cist.) (1738.09.03 – 1745.12.15), later Bishop of Mariana (Brazil) (1745.12.15 – 1764.01.03)
 Francisco de São Tiago, Friars Minor (O.F.M.) (1745.12.15 – death 1752.12.12)
 Antônio de São José, Augustinians (O.S.A.) (1756.07.19 – 1778.07.20) later Metropolitan Archbishop of São Salvador da Bahia (Brazil) (1778.07.20 – death 1779.08.09)
 Jacinto Carlos da Silveira (1779.03.01 – retired 1780.04.29)
 José do Menino Jesus, Discalced Carmelites (O.C.D.) (1780.09.18 – 1783.07.18), later Bishop of Viseu (Portugal) (1783.07.18 – death 1791.01.14)
 Antônio de Pádua e Belas, O.F.M. (1783.07.18 – retired 1794.08.28)
 Joaquim Ferreira de Carvalho (1795.06.01 – death 1801.04.26)
 Luiz de Brito Homem (1802.05.24 – death 1813.12.10), previously Bishop of São Paulo de Loanda (Angola) (1791.12.17 – 1802.05.24)
 Joaquim de Nossa Senhora de Nazareth Oliveira e Abreu, O.F.M. (1819.08.23 – 1824.05.03), previously Bishop-Prelate of Territorial Prelature of Mozambique (Mozambique) (1811.12.17 – 1819.08.23) & Titular Bishop of Leontopolis in Bithynia (1815.09.04 – 1819.08.23); later Bishop of Coimbra (Portugal) (1824.05.03 – death 1851.08.31)
 Marcos Antônio de Souza (1827.06.25 – death 1842.11.29)
 Carlos de São José e Souza, O.C.D. (1844.01.22 – death 1850.04.03)
 Manoel Joaquim da Silveira (1851.09.05 – 1861.01.05), later Metropolitan Archbishop of São Salvador da Bahia (Brazil) (1861.01.05 – death 1874.06.23)
 Luiz da Conceição Saraiva, O.S.B. (1861.07.22 – death 1876.04.26)
 Antônio Cândido Alvarenga (1877.09.21 – 1898.11.28), later Bishop of São Paulo (Brazil) (1898.11.28 – 1903.04.01)
Apostolic Administrator Fr. Luis de Salles Pessoa (1898 – death 1898)
 Antônio Xisto Albano (1901.03.23 – 1905.12.14), emeritate as Titular Bishop of Bethsaida (1905.12.14 – death 1917.02.21)
Bishop-elect Santino Maria da Silva Coutinho (1906.09.09 – 1906.12.06), later Metropolitan Archbishop of Belém do Pará (Brazil) (1906.12.06 – 1923.01.19), Metropolitan Archbishop of Maceió (Brazil) (1923.01.19 – 1939.01.10)
 Francisco de Paula Silva, Congregation of the Mission (C.M.) (1907.04.18 – death 1918.06.04)
 Helvécio Gomes de Oliveira, S.D.B. (1918.06.18 – 1921.12.02 see below), previously Bishop of Corumbá (Brazil) (1918.02.15 – 1918.06.18)

 Archbishop of São Luís do Maranhão  
 Helvécio Gomes de Oliveira, S.D.B. (see above 1921.12.02 – 1922.02.10)

Metropolitan Archbishops of São Luís do Maranhão 
 Octaviano Pereira de Albuquerque (1922.10.27 – 1935.12.16), previously Bishop of Piaui (Brazil) (1914.04.02 – 1922.10.27); later Archbishop-Bishop of Campos (Brazil) (1935.12.16 – death 1949.01.03)
 Carlos Carmelo de Vasconcelos Motta (1935.12.19 – 1944.08.13), previously Titular Bishop of Algiza (1932.07.29 – 1935.12.19) & Auxiliary Bishop of Diamantina (Brazil) (1932.07.29 – 1935.12.19); later Metropolitan Archbishop of São Paulo (Brazil) (1944.08.13 – 1964.04.18), created Cardinal-Priest of S. Pancrazio (1946.02.22 – 1982.09.18), also President of National Conference of Bishops of Brazil (1952 – 1958), Apostolic Administrator of Aparecida (Brazil) (1958.04.19 – 1964.04.18), succeeded as Metropolitan Archbishop of Aparecida (1964.04.18 – death 1982.09.18), also Apostolic Administrator of Lorena (Brazil) (1970 – 1971.11.03), Protopriest of Sacred College of Cardinals (1977.08.02 – 1982.09.18)
 Adalberto Accioli Sobral (1947.01.18 – death 1951.05.24), previously Bishop of Barra (Brazil) (1927.04.22 – 1934.01.13), Bishop of Pesqueira (Brazil) (1934.01.13 – 1947.01.18)
 José de Medeiros Delgado (1951.09.04 – 1963.05.10), previously Bishop of Caicó (Brazil) (1941.03.15 – 1951.09.04); later Metropolitan Archbishop of Fortaleza (Brazil) (1963.05.10 – retired 1973.03.26)
 João José da Mota e Albuquerque (1964.04.28 – retired 1984.03.20), previously Bishop of Afogados da Ingazeira (Brazil) (1957.01.04 – 1961.02.28), Bishop of Sobral (Brazil) (1961.02.28 – 1964.04.28)
 Paulo Eduardo Andrade Ponte (1984.03.20 – retired 2005.09.21), also Vice-President of National Conference of Bishops of Brazil (1987 – 1991); previously Bishop of Itapipoca (Brazil) (1971.06.25 – 1984.03.20)
 José Belisário da Silva, O.F.M. (2005.09.21 – ...), also Vice-President of National Conference of Bishops of Brazil (2011.05.10 – 2015.04.20), Second Vice-President of Latin American Episcopal Council (2015.05.13 – ...); previously Bishop of Bacabal (Brazil) (1999.12.01 – 2005.09.21)

Auxiliary bishops
Otàvio Barbosa Aguiar (1954-1956), appointed Bishop of Campina Grande, Paraiba
Antônio Batista Fragoso (1957-1964), appointed Bishop of Crateús, Ceara
Manuel Edmilson da Cruz (1966-1974), appointed Auxiliary Bishop of Fortaleza, Ceara
Xavier Gilles de Maupeou d’Ableiges (1995-1998), appointed Bishop of Viana, Maranhão
Geraldo Dantas de Andrade, S.C.I. (1998-2010)
José Carlos Chacorowski, C.M. (2010-2013), appointed Bishop of Caraguatatuba, Sao Paulo
Esmeraldo Barreto de Farias, Ist. del Prado (2015-2020), appointed Bishop of Araçuaí, Minas Gerais

Other priest of this diocese who became bishop
Benedito Araújo, appointed Coadjutor Bishop of Guajará-Mirim, Rondonia in 2011

Province 
Its ecclesiastical province comprises the Metropolitan's own archdiocese and the following Suffragan dioceses:
 Roman Catholic Diocese of Bacabal 
 Roman Catholic Diocese of Balsas
 Roman Catholic Diocese of Brejo
 Roman Catholic Diocese of Carolina
 Roman Catholic Diocese of Caxias do Maranhão
 Roman Catholic Diocese of Coroatá
 Roman Catholic Diocese of Grajaú
 Roman Catholic Diocese of Imperatriz
 Roman Catholic Diocese of Pinheiro
 Roman Catholic Diocese of Viana, Brazil
 Roman Catholic Diocese of Zé Doca

Source and external links 
 GCatholic.org with incumbent biography links
 Catholic Hierarchy
 Archdiocese website (Portuguese)

 01
São Luís, Maranhão
Sao Luis Do Maranhao
Sao Luis do Maranhao
1677 establishments in Brazil
Religious organizations established in the 1670s
Sao Luis Do Maranhao